Shiryu (written: 紫龍) is a masculine Japanese given name meaning Purple Dragon. Notable people with the name include:

Possible writings

The name's meaning is' purple dragon kanji spelled.

紫龍 "purple dragon"

People
Choun Shiryu (趙雲 子龍) (born 1978) Japanese professional wrestler
Shiryu Fujiwara (藤原 志龍) (born 2000) Japanese footballer 
Morita Shiryū (森田 子龍) (1912–1998) Japanese artist 
Shiryu Hayashi (林 紫龍, born. during the Edo period (17th century) of Japan) a notable swordsman 
Kazuhiro "Kaz" Hayashi (born May 18, 1973) is a Japanese professional wrestler who has used the name Shiryu as an alias.

Fictional characters
Dragon Shiryū, a character from the manga and anime series Saint Seiya
 Shiryu of the Rain, a character from the manga and anime series One Piece

References

Japanese masculine given names